, is a Japanese boy band. The group consists of five members: Yudai Ohno, Toru Iwaoka, Taiki Kudo, Sota Hanamura, and Hayate Wada. They were formerly signed to Universal Sigma until they transferred to Avex Trax in June 2020. They are currently managed by Avex Management Inc.

Name 
Despite the hyphen in the group's name, it is pronounced as "dice". Five sides of a dice represent the members, while the last side represents the fans. The "a-i" in the name is intentionally spelt in lowercase, as "ai" means love in the Japanese language.

History

2011–2014: Formation and early years 
In January 2011, Yudai Ohno, Toru Iwaoka, Taiki Kudo, Sota Hanamura, and Hayate Wada were gathered and formed into a group by their current manager. The group, initially named Blackout, soon decided to change their names because "blackout" meant a power outage. In April, they held their first concert in Shibuya Vuenos.

From May to September 2012, Da-ice performed as the opening act for their agency mates AAA in "AAA Tour 2012 -777- Triple Seven". This significantly widened their exposure to the public, and by the end of the tour their Twitter followers had grown from about 2,000 to over 10,000. On 12 December 2012, the group released their self-titled debut indie mini-album. It ranked 1st on the Recochoku ringtone daily chart, and reached a peak of number 15 on the Oricon Daily Albums Chart.

Following the release of the album, Da-ice held their first tour in January 2013. In May of the same year, they held their second tour. On 5 June 2013, they released their first indie single, "I'll Be Back". The single ranked number 14 on the Oricon Weekly Singles Chart, and achieved number one on the Recochoku ringtone daily chart. In July, they announced they would be making their debut in 2014, and in October, it was announced that a nationwide online vote would determine their debut single. At the end of 2013, the group transferred to Universal Music Japan's subsidiary, Universal Sigma.

On 15 January 2014, the group released their debut single, "Shout It Out", which ranked fourth place on the Oricon Weekly Charts. In March, they held their third tour. Following the release of two subsequent singles, Da-ice released their first full album, Fight Back, as well as a DVD of their third tour, on 15 October .
On 8 November 2015, the group announced that they would be releasing their second full-length album Every Season. All four singles from 2015 will be included in this album.

2016–present: Every Season 
Officially released on 6 January 2016, Every Season ranked first place on the Oricon Daily Ranking on 5 January, a day prior to its official release. Their album sales had reached more than 30,000 copies sold. Every Season includes four singles from 2015 and a collaboration with SKY-HI from their senior group, AAA. On 1 February 2016, it was announced that Da-iCE would perform their first Hall Tour across Japan starting in July, with its final stop at Tokyo Nippon Budokan on 1 January 2017. This would be the first time the group had performed at an Arena as a solo act. On 8 February, they wrapped up their third tour with a surprise announcement of their single "Watch Out", and their third concert live DVD Da-ice Live House Tour 2015–2016: Phase 4 Hello, released simultaneously on 6 April 2016. The single "Watch Out" was released in 3 versions and individual member versions. The third live DVD featured the semi-final performance in Tokyo at the Toyosu PIT on 31 January 2016, and included a limited edition one hour recording called "the Road to Nippon Budokan". 

On 5 September 2021, the group released their single "liveDevil", which serves as the opening theme song for the 32nd entry of the Kamen Rider series, Kamen Rider Revice. The song featured additional vocals from Subaru Kimura, who also voiced one of Revice'''s main characters. On 30 December, their single "Citrus" won the Grand Prix at the 63rd Japan Record Awards.

The group is featured as the fictional boy band 4*Town in the Japanese dub of the 2022 Pixar film Turning Red. They performed Japanese version of the song Nobody like u, titled  どんな君 '' (Donna Kimi Mo) and released on 25 February of 2022 as a single on major platforms including YouTube and Spotify; most of its lines are sung by Sota and Yudai.

Members
  – leader, performer
  – performer
  – vocalist
  – vocalist
  – performer

Discography

Singles

Albums

Video releases

Collaborative works

Photobooks

Achievements
2015
The Japan Gold Disc Award 2015 - Best 5 New Artist
2021
63rd Japan Record Awards Grand Prix winners

References

External links
  
 Da-iCE Universal sigma profile 

Avex Group artists
Japanese boy bands
Japanese dance music groups
Japanese pop music groups
Musical groups established in 2011